Callionymus scabriceps, the Jolo dragonet, is a species of dragonet found in the Pacific waters of the Philippines and possibly also from Taiwan.  This species grows to a length of  SL.

References 

S
Fish described in 1941